Afroneta bamilekei is a species of sheet weaver found in Cameroon. It was described by Bosmans in 1988.

References

Endemic fauna of Cameroon
Linyphiidae
Invertebrates of Cameroon
Spiders of Africa
Spiders described in 1988